Cavallirio is a comune (municipality) in the Province of Novara in the Italian region Piedmont, located about  northeast of Turin and about  northwest of Novara.

Cavallirio borders the following municipalities: Boca, Cureggio, Fontaneto d'Agogna, Prato Sesia, and Romagnano Sesia.

References

External links
 Official website

Cities and towns in Piedmont